The South American section of the 1962 FIFA World Cup qualification saw 7 teams competing 3 berths in the finals.

Format
Among the 7 teams, Paraguay were drawn to play in the CONMEBOL / CCCF / NAFC Intercontinental Play-off. The remaining 6 teams were divided into 3 groups of 2 teams each. The teams played against each other on a home-and-away basis. The group winners would qualify. Brazil did not participate, as they qualified automatically after winning the 1958 World Cup while Chile qualified automatically as hosts. Venezuela did not enter the tournament.

Group 1

Group 2

Group 3

Inter-confederation play-offs

Qualified Teams

1 Bold indicates champions for that year. Italic indicates hosts for that year.

Goalscorers

3 goals

 Oreste Corbatta

2 goals

 Martín Pando
 José Sanfilippo
 Rubén Héctor Sosa
 Carlos Alberto Raffo

1 goal

 Ricardo José Maria Ramaciotti
 Máximo Alcócer
 Wilfredo Camacho
 Eusebio Escobar
 Héctor Garzon González
 Alberto Spencer
 Faustino Delgado
 Ángel Cabrera
 Luis Cubilla
 Guillermo Escalada

1 own goal

 Romulo Gómez (playing against Argentina)

References

External links
FIFA World Cup Official Site – 1962 World Cup Qualification
 RSSF.com

CONMEBOL
FIFA World Cup qualification (CONMEBOL)
1960 in South American football
1960 in Argentine football
1960 in Colombian football
1960 in Peruvian football
1961 in Uruguayan football